Death at Nuremberg is the fourth novel in the Clandestine Operations Series by  W.E.B. Griffin and William E. Butterworth IV.

Plot
This novel centers around Capt. James Cronley, the central character of all the novels of the series. Cronley has been replaced as chief of DCI Europe to protect the U.S. chief prosecutor in the Nuremberg trials from a rumored Soviet kidnapping. He soon gets charged with hunting down the leadership of Odessa, an organization that helps Nazi war criminals escape to South America. As Cronley gets closer to uncovering the workings of Odessa, he is targeted twice for assassination. Cronley's quest takes him to his mother's home town of Strasbourg and to Vienna. At Strasbourg he picks up his cousin Luther, who turns out to be a war criminal himself and is taken to Nuremberg. As with the other books in this series, Death at Nuremberg is filled with intrigue as agents of the fledgling CIA work to rid the United States of enemies in Europe.

Reviews
The Real Book Spy website liked this book, up to a point, saying in its review of it, "While it’s a step up from last year’s Curtain of Death, this year’s offering is still bloated with unnecessary sequences and far too many throwaway characters." The historical novel society was also lukewarm in its review of this book, saying, "Readers who enjoy twisty stories and the convoluted politics and maneuverings following war may enjoy this novel, but those seeking tension and suspense may want to look elsewhere."

Elise Cooper, in a review in the BlackFive website, made a more positive evaluation of this book, "Griffin’s signature writing style is very evident as he blends humor, espionage, danger, and great characters in his latest novel." A review in the bookreporter website also liked this book.

References

2017 American novels
Cold War spy novels
American spy novels
G. P. Putnam's Sons books